This station, MP 32.1, was located where the site of the old Allaben station. The old Allaben station was a big masonry building that served the village of Allaben. It was torn down in 1899, and replaced with a new pre-fabricated station. This was placed in the area where the depot before it was. This station was destroyed soon after the end of passenger service on the Ulster & Delaware in 1954.

The railroad tracks next to the former station site are leased to the Catskill Mountain Railroad.

References

External links
 Catskill Mountain Railroad

Railway stations in the Catskill Mountains
Former Ulster and Delaware Railroad stations
Railway stations in Ulster County, New York
Former railway stations in New York (state)
Railway stations closed in 1954